Acraea turna is a butterfly in the family Nymphalidae. It is found on Madagascar.

Description

A. turna Mab. is a broad-winged species with the ground-colour of both wings milk-white and an expanse of about 60 mm.; distal margin of the forewing distinctly emarginate; both wings with marginal band not sharply defined, blackish above, grey beneath, and with light marginal spots, which, however, are often very small or indistinct on the upperside of the hindwing; forewing darkened at the base to beyond the middle of the cell, black-grey above, reddish in the cell beneath; two transverse spots in the cell and the discal dots large and black, discal dots 3 to 6 united with the median spot into an irregular transverse band, which is often joined both to the costal margin and the marginal band; basal and discal dots of the hindwing rather small, but all present and normally arranged; the discal dot in 4 placed close to the marginal band. Madagascar, ab. marmorata Smith only differs in having the ground-colour of both wings light yellow to sulphur-yellow. Madagascar.

Biology
The habitat consists of forests.

Taxonomy
Acraea turna is a member of the Acraea anemosa species group. The clade members are:
  
Acraea anemosa 
Acraea pseudolycia
Acraea turna

Classification of Acraea by Henning, Henning & Williams, Pierre. J. & Bernaud

Acraea (group anemosa) Henning, 1993 
Acraea (Acraea) Henning & Williams, 2010  
Acraea (Acraea) ( subgroup zetes) Pierre & Bernaud, 2013 
Acraea (Acraea)  Groupe  zetes Pierre & Bernaud, 2014

References

External links

Images representing  Acraea turna at Bold.

Butterflies described in 1877
turna
Endemic fauna of Madagascar
Butterflies of Africa
Taxa named by Paul Mabille